Jaime Anne King (born 18 December 1976) is a female English former competitive swimmer.

Swimming career
King represented Great Britain at three consecutive Summer Olympics, starting in 1992.

She is best known for winning the bronze medal at the 1997 European Championships (long course) in the women's 4×100-metre medley relay, alongside Sarah Price, Caroline Foot and Karen Pickering. She represented England and won a bronze medal in the 4 x 100 metres medley relay event, at the 1998 Commonwealth Games in Kuala Lumpur, Malaysia.

At the ASA National British Championships she won the 50 metres breaststroke in 1998, the 100 metres breaststroke title four times (1993, 1998, 2001, 2003) and the 200 metres breaststroke title three times (2001, 2002, 2003).

References

1976 births
Living people
Olympic swimmers of Great Britain
Swimmers at the 1992 Summer Olympics
Swimmers at the 1996 Summer Olympics
Swimmers at the 2000 Summer Olympics
Female breaststroke swimmers
Sportspeople from Swindon
Commonwealth Games bronze medallists for England
Swimmers at the 1998 Commonwealth Games
European Aquatics Championships medalists in swimming
English breaststroke swimmers
Commonwealth Games medallists in swimming
Medallists at the 1998 Commonwealth Games